The 1994–95 NCAA Division I men's basketball season concluded in the 64-team 1995 NCAA Division I men's basketball tournament whose finals were held at the Kingdome in Seattle, Washington. The UCLA Bruins earned their eleventh national championship by defeating the Arkansas Razorbacks 89–78 on April 3, 1995. They were coached by Jim Harrick and the NCAA basketball tournament Most Outstanding Player was UCLA's Ed O'Bannon.

In the 32-team 1995 National Invitation Tournament, the Virginia Tech Hokies defeated the Marquette Warriors at Madison Square Garden in New York City.

Following the season, the 1995 NCAA Men's Basketball All-American Consensus First team included Ed O'Bannon, Shawn Respert, Joe Smith, Jerry Stackhouse, and Damon Stoudamire.

Season headlines 
 Jim Harrick led the UCLA Bruins to its eleventh National Championship, his first.

Pre-season polls 
The top 25 from the pre-season AP Poll.

Conference membership changes 

These schools joined new conferences for the 1994–95 season.

Regular season

Conference winners and tournaments 
30 conference seasons concluded with a single-elimination tournament, with only the Big Ten Conference, Ivy League and the Pac-10 Conference choosing not to conduct conference tournaments. Conference tournament winners, with the exception of the American West Conference received an automatic bid to the NCAA tournament.

Statistical leaders

Post-season tournaments

NCAA tournament

Final Four – Kingdome, Seattle, Washington

National Invitation tournament

Semifinals & finals 

 Third Place - Penn State 66, Canisius 62

Award winners

Consensus All-American teams

Major player of the year awards 
 Wooden Award: Joe Smith, Maryland
 Naismith Award: Joe Smith, Maryland
 Associated Press Player of the Year: Joe Smith, Maryland
 NABC Player of the Year: Shawn Respert, Michigan State
 Oscar Robertson Trophy (USBWA): Ed O'Bannon, UCLA
 Adolph Rupp Trophy: Joe Smith, Maryland
 Sporting News Player of the Year: Shawn Respert, Michigan State
 UPI College Basketball Player of the Year: Joe Smith, Maryland

Major freshman of the year awards 
 USBWA Freshman of the Year: No Award Given

Major coach of the year awards 
 Associated Press Coach of the Year: Kelvin Sampson, Oklahoma
 Henry Iba Award (USBWA): Kelvin Sampson, Oklahoma
 NABC Coach of the Year: Jim Harrick, UCLA
 Naismith College Coach of the Year: Jim Harrick, UCLA
 Sporting News Coach of the Year: Jud Heathcote, Michigan State

Other major awards 
 NABC Defensive Player of the Year: Tim Duncan, Wake Forest
 Frances Pomeroy Naismith Award (Best player under 6'0): Tyus Edney, UCLA
 Robert V. Geasey Trophy (Top player in Philadelphia Big 5): Kerry Kittles, Villanova
 NIT/Haggerty Award (Top player in New York City metro area): Joe Griffin, Long Island

Coaching changes 

A number of teams changed coaches during the season and after it ended.

References